Lascellas-Ponzano is a municipality located in the province of Huesca, Aragon, Spain. According to the 2005 census (INE), the municipality has a population of 166 inhabitants.

References

Municipalities in the Province of Huesca